Jews for Urban Justice (JUJ) was a Jewish-American left-wing activist organization based in Washington, D.C., and its surrounding suburbs. The organization was founded to oppose anti-black racism within the white Jewish community.

History
Jews for Urban Justice was created by young Jewish intellectuals in the Summer of 1966 to oppose anti-black racism from white Jewish landlords and businesspeople, which they felt fueled antisemitism in the African-American community. Alleging that white Jews and predominantly white Jewish institutions were "part of the power structure" and that white Jews "gyp and rob" African-Americans in the ghetto, JUJ urged rabbis and other Jewish community leaders to address the problems of racism and classism within the Jewish community. Jews for Justice fought for equal access to housing for African-Americans at a time when white Jewish land developers in the DC metropolitan area used racially restrictive covenants that excluded African-Americans and other people of color from buying homes in white Jewish neighborhoods.

JUJ was involved in Martin Luther King Jr.'s Poor People's Campaign, the Mothers Day Welfare Rights March, and the Delano grape strike. In solidarity with the United Farm Workers strike, JUJ urged synagogues and rabbis in the DC area to forgo using California grapes in their sukkahs. JUJ succeeded in convincing Joseph Danzansky to stop carrying California grapes at Giant Food grocery store locations.

JUJ helped organize the Freedom Seder on the third night of Pesach, April 4, 1969, the anniversary of the assassination of Martin Luther King Jr. Arthur Waskow, a JUJ member and Jewish Renewal rabbi, was instrumental in creating the Freedom Seder. Waskow created a new Haggadah for the seder, saying "I wove the story of the liberation of ancient Hebrews from Pharaoh with the liberation struggles of black America, of the Vietnamese people, passages from Dr. King, from Gandhi." 800 people gathered for the Freedom Seder at the Lincoln Temple, an historically black Protestant church in Washington, D.C., bringing together blacks, whites, Christians, and Jews. The seder was attended by prominent black civil rights leaders, including Reverend Channing E. Phillips and Topper Carew.

In 1970, JUJ released a manifesto titled "The Oppression and Liberation of the Jewish People in America", outlining their ideology as an anti-racist, anti-war, Jewish socialist organization that was critical of the mainstream Jewish establishment. The manifesto calls for white Jewish solidarity with African-American, Native American, Chicano, Italian-American, and Appalachian communities. The JUJ manifesto is critical of Israeli policy towards Palestinians and supports Palestinian self-determination, but is not explicitly anti-Zionist. JUJ's manifesto critiqued conflating Zionism with Jewishness and objected to antisemitic expressions of anti-Zionism.

See also
African American–Jewish relations
History of the Jews in Washington, D.C.
Jewish left

References

External links
Guide to the Jews for Urban Justice (Washington, D.C.) Records, 1967-1971, processed by Nicole Greenhouse for the American Jewish Historical Society Center for Jewish History
The Oppression and Liberation of the Jewish People in America, the JUJ Manifesto on the Marxist Internet Archive

1966 establishments in Washington, D.C.
1971 disestablishments in Washington, D.C.
African-American history of Montgomery County, Maryland
African-American history of Washington, D.C.
African American–Jewish relations
African Americans' rights organizations
Allies (social justice)
Anti-black racism in the United States
Anti-imperialist organizations
Anti-racist organizations in the United States
Anti–Vietnam War groups
Defunct democratic socialist organizations in the United States
Defunct organizations based in Washington, D.C.
History of racism in Maryland
Human rights organizations based in the United States
Jewish-American political organizations
Jewish anti-occupation groups
Jewish anti-racism
Jewish socialism
Jews and Judaism in Montgomery County, Maryland
Jews and Judaism in Washington, D.C.
Libertarian socialist organizations
Opposition to antisemitism in the United States
Religious organizations based in Washington, D.C.
Socialism in Maryland
White American culture in Maryland
White American culture in Washington, D.C.